Conway is a city in Laclede County, Missouri, United States. The population was 788 at the 2010 census.

History
Conway was platted in 1869, and named after a local merchant. A post office has been in operation at Conway since 1871.

Geography

Demographics

2010 census
As of the census of 2010, there were 788 people, 303 households, and 213 families residing in the city. The racial makeup of the city was 94.8% White, 0.4% African American, 0.9% Native American, 0.1% Asian, 0.1% Pacific Islander, 1.0% from other races, and 2.7% from two or more races. Hispanic or Latino of any race were 2.8% of the population.

There were 303 households, of which 43.2% had children under the age of 18 living with them, 46.2% were married couples living together, 16.5% had a female householder with no husband present, 7.6% had a male householder with no wife present, and 29.7% were non-families. 25.7% of all households were made up of individuals, and 14.2% had someone living alone who was 65 years of age or older. The average household size was 2.60 and the average family size was 3.08.

The median age in the city was 33.9 years. 30.6% of residents were under the age of 18; 7.9% were between the ages of 18 and 24; 24.7% were from 25 to 44; 21.3% were from 45 to 64; and 15.2% were 65 years of age or older. The gender makeup of the city was 49.6% male and 50.4% female.

2000 census
As of the census of 2000, there were 743 people, 310 households, and 202 families residing in the city. The population density was 408.0 inhabitants per square mile (157.6/km2). There were 351 housing units at an average density of 192.8 per square mile (74.5/km2). The racial makeup of the city was 98.52% White, 0.67% Native American, 0.54% from other races, and 0.27% from two or more races. Hispanic or Latino of any race were 2.29% of the population.

There were 310 households, out of which 34.2% had children under the age of 18 living with them, 48.1% were married couples living together, 13.5% had a female householder with no husband present, and 34.8% were non-families. 31.9% of all households were made up of individuals, and 17.1% had someone living alone who was 65 years of age or older. The average household size was 2.40 and the average family size was 3.00.

In the city the population was spread out, with 28.7% under the age of 18, 10.1% from 18 to 24, 26.0% from 25 to 44, 20.5% from 45 to 64, and 14.8% who were 65 years of age or older. The median age was 34 years. For every 100 females, there were 91.0 males. For every 100 females age 18 and over, there were 80.9 males.

The median income for a household in the city was $21,736, and the median income for a family was $30,962. Males had a median income of $25,188 versus $15,769 for females. The per capita income for the city was $11,623. About 12.5% of families and 18.6% of the population were below the poverty line, including 20.6% of those under age 18 and 21.7% of those age 65 or over.

Culture

Annual town festival
The citizens of Conway hold a community festival each year.  This community festival is known as "Conway Community Days" and is held the weekend after Labor Day, in September.  The community festival begins on a Friday evening and lasts until the early hours of Sunday morning.  Activities include food vendors, dancing, singing, and amusement rides.  Local youth, church, and adult organizations participate in a parade.

Sports
Conway is also the home of a proud athletics program; Conway "Bears". In the 2006-2007 basketball season, the Conway Bears were 26–3, Summit Conference Champions (6-0), Class 3 District 13 Champs, Sectional Champs and were a point away from going to the state final four. The 06-07 basketball Bears were also Conway Invitational Tournament Champs for the third time in four years and the Skyline Invitational Champs after a win over then 4th ranked Warsaw. They had the best record in school history. In 2008 the Conway baseball Bears finished third in the state tournament for the first time in school history. Also in 2008, Conway track was well represented at the state meet with Dallis Bailey winning the 800 meter state championship as a freshman. There was also a girls relay team that placed high enough to earn all state honors.

Scouting

Conway has a long history of Scouting for youth.  Cub Scout 'Pack 44', Boy Scout 'Troop 44', BSA Venture 'Crew 44' are an active part of the community.  Each of these units are part of the Ozark Trails Council (# 306) of the Boy Scouts of America.  Conway also has girls participating in Girl Scouting as part of Girl Scouts of the Missouri Heartland.

Youth education
Conway is the site for all schools of the Laclede County R-1 school district.  The district is the result of various school district consolidations that occurred in the mid 20th century, the most controversial of which was the consolidation with Phillipsburg School District.

Notable person
 Harry Holman, actor who appeared in over 100 films, including It's a Wonderful Life

References

External links
 City of Conway official website
 Historic maps of Conway in the Sanborn Maps of Missouri Collection at the University of Missouri

Cities in Laclede County, Missouri
Cities in Missouri